Auguste Théodore Vander Meersch (1810–1881) was a Belgian writer who was heavily involved in producing the Biographie Nationale de Belgique.

Life
Vander Meersch was born in Ghent on 25 August 1810. He studied at Ghent University, graduating with a doctorate in law in 1833. Abandoning the legal profession, he focused his efforts on local history and biographical research.

When Jules de Saint-Genois launched the plan for a Biographie Nationale, Vander Meersch drafted the first list of who should be included. He undertook the management of the venture, seeing to the printing, accounting and correspondence. He also wrote a number of entries himself, especially of lesser literary figures for which no takers could be found among the regular contributors.

Vander Meersch was furthermore a contributor on political and economic questions to the daily newspapers. He died in Ghent on 7 November 1881.

References

1810 births
1881 deaths
Ghent University alumni
Belgian biographers